The Országos Bajnokság I (commonly abbreviated OB I) is the highest level hockey league in Hungary.

After the formation of the MOL Liga, the OB I returned to having only Hungarian teams. The regular season coincides with the games played between the Hungarian teams in the MOL Liga, with these games also counting towards the national championship. The best three teams advance to the play-offs of OB I, where Alba Volán Székesfehérvár joins them as the fourth team.

Current teams

Past winners

Champions by season

1936–37: Budapesti Korcsolyázó Egylet
1937–38: Budapesti Korcsolyázó Egylet
1938–39: Budapesti Korcsolyázó Egylet
1939–40: Budapesti Korcsolyázó Egylet
1940–41: Budapesti Budai TE
1941–42: Budapesti Korcsolyázó Egylet
1942–43: Budapesti Budai TE
1943–44: Budapesti Korcsolyázó Egylet
1944–45: not held
1945–46: Budapesti Korcsolyázó Egylet
1946–47: Magyar Testgyakorlók Köre
1947–48: Magyar Testgyakorlók Köre
1948–49: Magyar Testgyakorlók Köre
1949–50: Meteor Mallerd
1950–51: Budapesti Kinizsi SK  
1951–52: Budapesti Vörös Meteor
1952–53: Budapesti Postás
1953–54: Budapesti Postás
1954–55: Budapesti Kinizsi SK  
1955–56: Budapesti Kinizsi SK  
1956–57: Budapesti Vörös Meteor
1957–58: Újpesti Dózsa SC
1958–59: Budapesti Vörös Meteor 
1959–60: Újpesti Dózsa SC  
1960–61: Ferencvárosi TC 
1961–62: Ferencvárosi TC
1962–63: Budapesti Vörös Meteor
1963–64: Ferencvárosi TC
1964–65: Újpesti Dózsa SC 
1965–66: Újpesti Dózsa SC
1966–67: Ferencvárosi TC
1967–68: Újpesti Dózsa SC
1968–69: Újpesti Dózsa SC
1969–70: Újpesti Dózsa SC 
1970–71: Ferencvárosi TC
1971–72: Ferencvárosi TC
1972–73: Ferencvárosi TC 
1973–74: Ferencvárosi TC
1974–75: Ferencvárosi TC 
1975–76: Ferencvárosi TC
1976–77: Ferencvárosi TC
1977–78: Ferencvárosi TC
1978–79: Ferencvárosi TC
1979–80: Ferencvárosi TC
1980–81: Székesfehérvári Volán SC   
1981–82: Újpesti Dózsa SC  
1982–83: Újpesti Dózsa SC
1983–84: Ferencvárosi TC 
1984–85: Újpesti Dózsa SC 
1985–86: Újpesti Dózsa SC 
1986–87: Újpesti Dózsa SC
1987–88: Újpesti Dózsa SC  
1988–89: Ferencvárosi TC 
1989–90: Jászberényi Lehel HC
1990–91: Ferencvárosi TC
1991–92: Ferencvárosi TC
1992–93: Ferencvárosi TC 
1993–94: Ferencvárosi TC
1994–95: Ferencvárosi TC 
1995–96: Dunaferr SE
1996–97: Ferencvárosi TC
1997–98: Dunaferr SE
1998–99: Alba Volán-Riceland  
1999–00: Dunaferr SE
2000–01: Alba Volán-FeVita  
2001–02: Dunaferr SE
2002–03: Alba Volán-FeVita  
2003–04: Alba Volán-FeVita
2004–05: Alba Volán-FeVita
2005–06: Alba Volán-FeVita
2006–07: Alba Volán-FeVita
2007–08: Alba Volán SC
2008–09: Alba Volán SC
2009–10: SAPA Fehérvár AV 19
2010–11: SAPA Fehérvár AV 19
2011–12: SAPA Fehérvár AV 19
2012-13: Dunaújvárosi Acélbikák
2013-14: Dunaújvárosi Acélbikák
2014-15: Miskolci Jegesmedvék JSE
2015-16: DVTK Jegesmedvék
2016-17: DVTK Jegesmedvék
2017-18: MAC Budapest
2018-19: Ferencvárosi TC
2019-20: Ferencvárosi TC
2020-21: Ferencvárosi TC
2021-22: Ferencvárosi TC

Titles by club

References

External links
Official website of the Hungarian Ice Hockey Federation

 
Sports leagues established in 1937
1937 establishments in Hungary
Professional ice hockey leagues in Hungary
Top tier ice hockey leagues in Europe